Naima Coster is a Dominican-American writer known for her debut novel, Halsey Street, which was published in January 2018. Coster is the recipient of numerous awards including a Pushcart Prize nomination.

Life and career 
Naima Coster was born in Fort Greene, Brooklyn, NY. She identifies as Black and Latina.

Coster holds an MFA in Fiction from Columbia University, an MA in English and Creative Writing from Fordham University, and a BA in English and African American studies from Yale University. She is an alumna of Prep for Prep, a leadership development program in New York City. She has taught writing to students in jail, youth programs, and universities.

She is the author of two novels, Halsey Street, and What's Mine and Yours. Her novels address topics such as gentrification, integration, and racial and cultural identity.

Her writing has appeared in publications including The New York Times, The Rumpus, Arts & Letters, Kweli, and Guernica. She also writes the newsletter, Bloom How You Must. As of 2018, she was a visiting assistant professor at Wake Forest University in North Carolina, where she lives with her family.

Works

Novels 

Halsey Street. Amazon Publishing, 2017. . 
What's Mine and Yours. Grand Central Publishing, 2021. .

Essays 

 Brooklyn Born, Paris Review Daily. May 2018. 
 Who Gets to Write About Gentrification? Lit Hub. January 2018.
 My Editor Was Black. Catapult. December 2017. 
 Reorientation. Winner of the Cosmonauts Avenue Non-Fiction Prize, judged by Roxane Gay. September 2017. 
 Albums of Our Lives: Nirvana's Nevermind. The Rumpus. June 2015.
 More Than Its Parts. A Practical Wedding. July 2014. 
 Fire Escape. Arts & Letters. Spring 2012. 
 Fontibón. The Ascentos Review. August 2011. 
 Brooklyn Bridge Park. The Fordham Observer. July 2011
 Remembering When Brooklyn Was Mine. The New York Times. February 2011.

Stories 
 Lila - Amazon Original Story
 Cold. Aster (ix) Journal (March 2017) & Kweli (June 2016). 
 The Spot. Cosmonauts Avenue. November 2016. 
 The Beach. The Fordham Observer. August 2011.
 Stories Told When The Lights Go Out. The Ascentos Review. August 2010.

Anthologies 

 Cosmonauts Avenue Anthology https://cosmonautsavenue.com/shop June 2019. 
 This is the Place: Women Writing About Home. Ed. by Margot Case & Kelly McMasters. Seal Press, Nov. 2017. 
 Best of Kweli: An Aster(ix) Anthology. Ed. by Angie Cruz & Laura Pegram. Spring 2017.

References

External links 
 Official website
 
 
 

21st-century American novelists
Living people
Year of birth missing (living people)
Place of birth missing (living people)
American women novelists
Yale University alumni
Fordham University alumni
21st-century American women writers
Columbia University School of the Arts alumni
People from Fort Greene, Brooklyn
Writers from Brooklyn
Novelists from New York (state)